Inside the Jihad: My Life with al Qaeda, a Spy's Story is a book published by Basic Books, written by a Moroccan who has adopted the pen-name Omar Nasiri.

In the novel, Nasiri describes moving to Europe, after being involved in petty crime in his homeland of Morocco. By 1996, however, he had been recruited by radical Islamic fundamentalists, and subsequently became an informant for European counter-terrorism agencies, such as the DGSE. He would later infiltrate the Khalden training camp in Afghanistan, where he would meet such influential al-Qaeda leaders as Ibn al-Shaykh al-Libi. Upon returning to Europe, he continued his work as a spy in London, before moving to Germany and getting married.

Translate
The book was translated to Persian and published by "Shahid Kazemi Publications" in 568 pages on 2019. The book is now in its fourth edition.

See also
Ibn al-Shaykh al-Libi
Abu Zubaydah
Midhat Mursi
Abu Hamza
Afghan training camp
Khalden training camp
Omar Khadr
Derunta training camp

References

Reviews of Inside the Jihad
Ahmed Rashid author of "Taliban: Militant Islam, Oil and Fundamentalism in Central Asia"
Michael Scheuer author of "Imperial Hubris", "Through Our Enemies Eyes" and "Marching Toward Hell America and Islam After Iraq"

External links
After a Decade at War With West, Al-Qaeda Still Impervious to Spies by Craig Whitlock of the  Washington Post March 20, 2008
Inside the Jihad by Henry Schuster of CNN, November 16, 2006

2006 non-fiction books
War on Terror books
Non-fiction books about jihadism
Non-fiction books about espionage
Books about al-Qaeda